Saad AlـKhanfour Al-Rasheedi is a Kuwaiti politician, representing the fourth district. Born in 1965, Al-Rasheedi worked at the Interior Ministry before being elected to the National Assembly in 2008.

See also
Politics of Kuwait

References

1965 births
Living people
Kuwaiti people of Arab descent
Members of the National Assembly (Kuwait)
Place of birth missing (living people)
Date of birth missing (living people)
21st-century Kuwaiti politicians